is a Japanese novelist. She is best known for The Phoenix Tree (Aogiri), which won the 1985 Akutagawa Prize.

Early life 
Kizaki was born on November 6, 1939, in Hsin Cheng, Manchuria. Her birth name is Masako Yokoyama. After Japan's defeat in World War II, Kizaki and her family returned to Japan, where her father worked as a chemistry professor in Toyama prefecture.

Career 
After graduation Kizaki worked at Teijin. She married her husband, a botanist named Hiromu Harada, in 1962, and they both moved to France and had two daughters. They briefly lived in Pasadena, California, but soon returned to France. She studied comparative literature at the University of Paris from 1976 to 1979. She returned to Japan in 1979, and began writing novels, short stories, and essays. In 1980 Kizaki was awarded Bugakukai Prize for New Writers for her debut story, Rasoku. Her novel Shizumeru Tera received the Ministry of Education's Geijutsu Sensho New Writer's Award. 

She was awarded the Akutagawa Prize for Aogiri, in 1985. It is a story about a young woman who nurses her aunt as she dies of breast cancer. Though she was awarded the prize two members of the committee were critical of Aogiri. Hideo Nakamura thought it was unlikely that the aunt would choose to die of cancer, while Saiichi Maruya said that her portrayal of the aunt was irresponsible to her readers and the characters. On the other hand, Fumio Niwa was impressed with her portrayal, and Shotaro Yasuoka and Shusaku Endo were impressed that she chose to write about a cancer patient at all.

Kizaki was baptized into the Catholic Church in 1982, which may explain the Christian themes in her work. Her work tends to be about women who overcome physical or spiritual problems. Kizaki has said that she draws spiritual guidance from Thérèse of Lisieux. Her work also hints at mysteries with deep, meaningful answers that end up having simple explanations.

Publications 

 Bare feet (1982
 The Phoenix Tree and Other Stories, 1985
, 1985
 The Sunken Temple (1987
, 1988
, 1989
, 1990
, 1990
, 1991
, 1991
, 1994
, 1996
, 1999
, 1999
, 1999
, 2002
, 2004

References 

1939 births
Living people
Japanese women novelists
Japanese novelists